The 2018–19 Premier 15s kicked-off on 18th September, 2018. The tournament consisted of 18 rounds with the final being played on 27th April, 2019. Saracens Women defeated Harlequins Ladies 33–17 in the finals and were crowned Champions.

Teams

Table 

Source: RFU

Regular Season

Round 1

Round 2

Round 3

Round 4

Round 5

Round 6

Round 7

Round 8

Round 9

Round 10

Round 11

Round 12

Round 13

Round 14

Round 15

Round 16

Round 17

Round 18

Playoffs

Semi-finals

Final

References

External links 

 

Premier 15s